Michael Pradeep Williams Jeh (born 21 April 1968) is a former cricketer who played for the Marylebone Cricket Club and Oxford University.

Jeh was born in Colombo, Ceylon and emigrated to Australia as a refugee at the age of 15. After graduating from Griffith University, he attended Oxford University, where he studied as a postgraduate.

Cricket career
While studying at Oxford, Jeh played first class cricket for Oxford and Combined Universities. He later played a single first class match for Marylebone Cricket Club.  Jeh also played for Valley District Cricket Club in Brisbane Grade Cricket, where he was a teammate of Matthew Hayden and a number of other Test and First-Class cricketers.

References

External links 
 
 

1968 births
Sri Lankan cricketers
Oxford University cricketers
Marylebone Cricket Club cricketers
Griffith University alumni
Alumni of Keble College, Oxford
Australian people of Sri Lankan Tamil descent
Living people
Australian cricketers
Oxford and Cambridge Universities cricketers
British Universities cricketers